Eupithecia scotodes is a moth in the family Geometridae. It is generally, but not exclusively, found in Australia.

References

Moths described in 1904
scotodes
Moths of Australia